Donald Alan Heinrich (September 19, 1930 – February 29, 1992) was an American football player, coach, and announcer.  He played professionally as a quarterback in National Football League (NFL) for the New York Giants and Dallas Cowboys, and in the American Football League (AFL) for the Oakland Raiders.  Heinrich played college football at the University of Washington.

Early years
Born in Chicago, Heinrich was raised in western Washington and graduated from Bremerton High School, west of Seattle, in 1948. As a senior in the fall of 1947, he led the Wildcats to the mythical state title. That winter, he contributed to the basketball team finishing in second-place at state.

College career

Heinrich played quarterback at Washington in Seattle, leading the nation in passing in 1950 and 1952, and setting many of the school's passing records. His 60.9 completion percentage in 1950 set an NCAA record. Heinrich missed the 1951 season due to a pre-season shoulder separation, and was selected in the third round of the 1952 NFL Draft, but stayed in college and played his fifth-year senior season with the Huskies in 1952.

He was inducted into the U.S. Army that November, prior to the Apple Cup in Spokane against Washington State, but was granted a pass to play. The Cougars had won the previous year in Husky Stadium while Heinrich was sidelined, but he led the Huskies to a 33–27 victory in 1952, and finished 3–0 in his career against WSC.

Heinrich played two seasons (1949, 1950) with hall of fame running back Hugh McElhenny. They were expected to play together for three, but Heinrich's shoulder injury put junior Sam Mitchell and sophomore Dean Rockey at quarterback in 1951; after three wins in their first four games, Washington went winless and fell to 3–6–1.

Professional career

New York Giants
Heinrich was selected by the New York Giants in the third round (35th overall) of the 1952 NFL Draft with a future draft pick, which allowed the team to draft him before his college eligibility was over.

He served in the military for just under two years, and also got a chance to play football for Fort Ord. He missed the 1953 season and reported to the Giants in 1954. While in the army, he played for the Fort Ord Warriors, which included running back Ollie Matson.

In his six seasons with the Giants, he saw action in three NFL championship games (1956, 1958, 1959), while being the starting quarterback of the 1956 title team. With Vince Lombardi as the Giants' offensive coordinator (1954–58), Heinrich split time at quarterback with Charlie Conerly, with him being used to probe defenses and Conerly coming into the games to capitalize on weaknesses.

Dallas Cowboys
Heinrich was selected by the Dallas Cowboys in the 1960 expansion draft. The head coach was Tom Landry, the defensive coordinator with the Giants through the 1959 season. Heinrich again shared time at quarterback, with veteran Eddie LeBaron and rookie Don Meredith.

Oakland Raiders
He returned as a player in 1962 after the American Football League Oakland Raiders bought his rights from the NFL's Cowboys. The Raiders needed quarterback depth after learning that the previous year's No. 1 draft choice, Tom Flores, would miss the season due to a lung infection.

Coaching career
In 1961, Heinrich returned to the Giants as a backfield coach under newly-promoted head coach Allie Sherman. From 1963 to 1964, he was the backfield coach for the Los Angeles Rams, under former Giants teammate Harland Svare. In 1965, he was hired as a scout for the expansion Atlanta Falcons. 

From 1966 to 1968, he was the assistant for offense and called the plays for the Pittsburgh Steelers under former Giants teammate Bill Austin. From 1969 to 1970, he was the backfield coach for the New Orleans Saints under Tom Fears. From 1971 to 1975, he began as the defensive backfield coach before being moved to the passing-receiving coach for the San Francisco 49ers under Dick Nolan.

Broadcasting career
In 1976, Heinrich began his broadcasting career, working first on Washington Huskies games and also as the first radio game analyst for the Seattle Seahawks Radio Network (working with Pete Gross and Wayne Cody) and then becoming an analyst for the 49ers' games. In 1983 and 1984, Heinrich was a color analyst for ESPN and ABC broadcasts of the United States Football League (USFL).

Heinrich worked with Preview Sports Publications, with whom he published the magazines Don Heinrich's College Football and Don Heinrich's Pro Preview, until his death. In 1991, he was the analyst for Pac-10 games on Prime Ticket, a cable channel based in Los Angeles.

Honors and death
In 1974, he was inducted into the State of Washington Sports Hall of Fame. In 1981, he was inducted into the Husky Hall of Fame. In 1987, he was inducted into the College Football Hall of Fame. In 1990, he was named the starting quarterback on Washington's Centennial Team.

Heinrich was diagnosed with pancreatic cancer in June 1991, and died at age 61 at his home in Saratoga, California.

See also
 List of American Football League players
 List of college football yearly passing leaders

References

External links
 
 State of Washington Sports Hall of Fame – Football – Don Heinrich
 Sports Press Northwest – Wayback Machine: 'Deadeye' Don Heinrich

 
 

1930 births
1992 deaths
People from Saratoga, California
Sportspeople from Chicago
People from Bremerton, Washington
Players of American football from Washington (state)
American football quarterbacks
Dallas Cowboys coaches
Dallas Cowboys players
Los Angeles Rams coaches
Atlanta Falcons scouts
New Orleans Saints coaches
New York Giants coaches
New York Giants players
Oakland Raiders players
Pittsburgh Steelers coaches
San Francisco 49ers announcers
San Francisco 49ers coaches
Seattle Seahawks announcers
Washington Huskies football players
United States Football League announcers
College Football Hall of Fame inductees
Deaths from cancer in California
Deaths from liver cancer
Deaths from pancreatic cancer
American Football League players
Players of American football from Chicago